Trayan is a given name or family name. The name may refer to:

Surname
 Aurore Trayan,  an athlete from France

Given name
 (990–1038)
 Trayan Dyankov
 Trayan Trayanov
 Trayan Dimitrov
 Trayan Dimitrov

See also

Trojan (disambiguation)
Troyan (disambiguation)